Rex Theatre or Rex Theater may refer to:

Other countries
Rex Theatre, Adelaide, Australia
Rex Theater (Haiti), Port-au-Prince, Haiti
Rex Theatre (Whitewood), Saskatchewan, Canada
Rex-Theater (Wuppertal), Germany

See also
Rex Cinema (disambiguation)